Scherner is a surname. Notable people with the surname include:

Fabiano Scherner (born 1972), German-Brazilian mixed martial artist
Julian Scherner (1895–1945), Nazi Party official
Karl Albert Scherner (1825–1889), German philosopher

See also
Scherer